Ganeshpur is a census village in Hoshiarpur District in the state of Punjab, India. Commonly two villages Ganeshpur & Bharta are collectively pronounced as Ganeshpur Bharta / Bharta / Bharta Ganeshpur.

Demographics
 India census, village Ganeshpur had a population of 1500. Males constitute 55% of the population and females 45%. Ganeshpur has an average literacy rate of 61%,

More information about Ganeshour
 Village Name: Ganeshpur
 Tehsil: Garhshankar
 District: Hoshiarpur
 Post Office: Ganeshpur
 Pin Code: 146106
 Area in Hectares: 114
 Telephone Code: 01884
 Population (2001): 1500
 Main Road (Nearest): Phagwara-Mahilpur
 Railway Station (Nearest): Saila Khurd 13 km
 Development Bock: Mahilpur
 Website: www.ganeshpur.com

References

Cities and towns in Hoshiarpur district

bn:গনেমপুর
bpy:গনেমপুর
new:गणेशपुर
pt:Ganeshpur
vi:Ganeshpur